Luis Paulo da Silva (born 4 December 1989), known as Paulão, is a Brazilian football player. He currently plays for Shanghai Jiading Huilong in China League One.

Club statistics
Updated to 23 February 2017.

References

External links
Profile at Soccerway

Living people
1989 births
Brazilian footballers
Brazilian expatriate footballers
J2 League players
J3 League players
China League One players
Roma Esporte Apucarana players
Associação Esportiva Recreativa Engenheiro Beltrão players
Hokkaido Consadole Sapporo players
Fukushima United FC players
Mito HollyHock players
Tochigi SC players
Albirex Niigata players
FC Gifu players
Shanghai Jiading Huilong F.C. players
Association football defenders
Brazilian expatriate sportspeople in Japan
Expatriate footballers in Japan
Brazilian expatriate sportspeople in China
Expatriate footballers in China